Commentry (Auvergnat: Comentriac) is a commune in the department of Allier in central France. It is within 8 km of one of the geographic centres of France. The film actress Yvonne Rozille (1900–1985) was born in Commentry.

Population

History 
Commentry was home to Compagnie de Commentry-Fourchambault-Decazeville, thanks to an important coal deposit. The coal mine fueled a huge growth in population, from under 1,000 to more than 12,000, while Stéphane Mony was its CEO (1840–1884). 
Commentry was the first commune ever to elect a socialist mayor: Christophe Thivrier was elected 6 June 1882. The Socialist Party of France was founded in Commentry in September 1902.

Economy
Commentry gave its name to a coal field over 21 square kilometres in extent, and historically had important foundries and forges.

Science
Charles Brongniart discovered many fossils near Commentry, including Meganeura in the Stephanian stage coal measures in 1880.

Personalities
 Jean Bayet (1882–1969) Professor of Latin Language and Literature at the Sorbonne, whose grandfather Gilbert Bayet was mayor of Commentry 1871–1873. 
 Henri Fayol (1841–1925) mining engineer, developed Fayolism, an approach to management and administration.
 Abel Gance (1889–1981) film director and producer, raised by maternal grandparents in Commentry until the age of eight. 
 Jacques Hillairet (1886-1984) historian specializing in the history of Paris, officer of the Legion of Honour.
 Émile Mâle (1862–1954) art historian and member of the Académie française.
 Stéphane Mony (1800–1884) Engineer, director of the colliery at Commentry; mayor from 1854 to 1883; deputy from 1868 to 1871.
 Christophe Thivrier (1841–1895) first elected Socialist mayor in France.
 Roger Vergé (1930–2015) Celebrated chef and restaurateur.

See also
Communes of the Allier department

References

Communes of Allier
Coal mining regions in France
Mining communities in France
Bourbonnais
Allier communes articles needing translation from French Wikipedia